The 2021 ASUN men's basketball tournament was the conference postseason tournament for the ASUN Conference. The tournament was the 42nd year the league has conducted a postseason tournament. The tournament was held March 4–7, 2021 in Jacksonville, Florida. Quarterfinals were played at both Swisher Gymnasium and UNF Arena, while the semifinals and finals were held solely at UNF Arena. The eligible winner received the conference's automatic bid to the NCAA tournament.

When No. 5 seeded North Alabama defeated No. 6 Florida Gulf Coast in the second semifinal game, Liberty was awarded the ASUN automatic bid to the NCAA tournament since North Alabama is ineligible as a team transitioning to Division I.

Seeds
All of the teams, except for Jacksonville, in the conference standings qualified for the tournament. Jacksonville cancelled their season after going 11–13, so they did not compete in the conference tournament. The teams were seeded by their record in conference play, with a tiebreaker system to seed teams with identical conference records.

The two tiebreakers used by the ASUN are: 1) head-to-head record of teams with identical record and 2) NCAA NET Rankings available on day following the conclusion of ASUN regular season play.

Schedule

Bracket
Teams are reseeded after the quarterfinals

References

Tournament
ASUN men's basketball tournament
ASUN men's basketball tournament